Nettapakkam is one of the three firkas of Bahour taluk in Pondicherry (North) revenue sub-division of the Indian union territory of Puducherry.

Revenue villages
The following are the revenue villages under Nettapakkam Firka:
 Embalam
 Eripakkam
 Kariamanickam
 Karikalampakkam
 Korkadu
 Maducarai
 Nettapakkam
 Pandasozhanallur

See also
Bahour firka
Selliamedu firka

References

External links
 Department of Revenue and Disaster Management, Government of Puducherry

Geography of Puducherry
Puducherry district